Purchase Bay is a fjord in the Canadian Arctic Archipelago, on the western side of Melville Island, Northwest Territories, Canada. It was named for the engineer of HMS Intrepid, Thomas Purchase, during the Belcher expedition

References

Bodies of water of the Northwest Territories
Bays of the Northwest Territories